KSKL (94.5 FM) is a radio station licensed to serve the community of Scott City, Kansas, United States. The station is owned by Mark Yearout, through licensee Southwind Broadcasting, LLC, and airs an adult contemporary format.

The station was assigned the call sign KFLA-FM by the Federal Communications Commission on June 7, 1965. The station changed its call sign to KULL on December 1, 1976, to KEZU on August 1, 1983, and to KSKL on March 30, 1990.

References

External links
 Official Website
 FCC Public Inspection File for KSKL
 FCC History Card for KSKL
 

SKL
Radio stations established in 1965
1965 establishments in Kansas
Mainstream adult contemporary radio stations in the United States
Scott County, Kansas